Machairophyllum is a genus of plants in the family Aizoaceae.

Selected species
Machairophyllum acuminatum L.Bolus
Machairophyllum albidum Schwantes
Machairophyllum baxteri L.Bolus
Machairophyllum bijlii (N.E.Br.) L.Bolus
Machairophyllum brevifolium L.Bolus
Machairophyllum cookii Schwantes
Machairophyllum latifolium L.Bolus
Machairophyllum stayneri L.Bolus
Machairophyllum stenopetalum L.Bolus
Machairophyllum vanbredai L.Bolus
 List sources :

References

Aizoaceae
Aizoaceae genera